Erre is a commune in the Nord department in northern France.

References

Communes of Nord (French department)